William 'Percy' Percival Morgan (1 January 1905 - 3 March 1983) was a Welsh cricketer.  Morgan was a right-handed batsman who bowled right-arm medium pace. He was born at Abercrave, Brecknockshire.

Morgan represented Glamorgan in a single first-class in 1925 against Nottinghamshire at St. Helen's.

In 1935, he played 2 Minor Counties Championship matches for the Glamorgan Second XI against Oxfordshire and Dorset.

Morgan died at Neath, Glamorgan on 3 March 1983.

References

External links
Percy Morgan at Cricinfo
Percy Morgan at CricketArchive

1905 births
1983 deaths
People from Brecknockshire
Sportspeople from Powys
Welsh cricketers
Glamorgan cricketers